D Mob (or D-Mob), also known as Dancin' Danny D or simply Danny D, is a British music producer and remixer. His most notable track was "C'mon and Get My Love"  with Cathy Dennis on the vocals, which peaked at number 10 on the U.S. Hot 100 chart on March 17, 1990.

Biography
The 1988 hit single "We Call It Acieed" reached No. 3 on the UK Singles Chart, and was one of a wave of acid house singles to enjoy success that year. The video was directed by Marek Budzynski. D Mob went on to have a further three top twenty singles in the UK during 1989 and 1990; "It Is Time to Get Funky", which reached No. 9, "C'mon and Get My Love", which reached No. 15, and "Put Your Hands Together", which reached No. 7.

In the late 1980s and early 1990s, D Mob charted five songs on the US Hot Dance Music/Club Play chart, four of which went to No. 1, including "We Call It Acieed", "It Is Time to Get Funky", "C'mon and Get My Love" (with Cathy Dennis), and "That's the Way of the World" (also with Dennis). In the U.S., they are best known for the hit "C'mon and Get My Love" featuring Dennis as vocalist, that crossed over to pop radio and hit No. 10 on the Billboard Hot 100 in 1990.
 
Aside from Dennis, Dancin' Danny D has collaborated with vocalists Dannii Minogue, Gary Haisman and LRS. 

Danny D, together with Tim Blacksmith, founded the publishing company Stellar Songs, as well as Tim & Danny Music, a company which has worked with Charli XCX, Emeli Sande and Labrinth in the past. The duo are known for managing the Norwegian production team Stargate, as well as being the executive producers for hits produced by them.

In 2022, Danny D and Tim Blacksmith were both made MBEs in the Queen's Jubilee Birthday Honours List for their services to music.

Discography

Albums

Singles

See also
List of Billboard number-one dance club songs
List of artists who reached number one on the U.S. Dance Club Songs chart
List of songs banned by the BBC
List of Polydor Records artists
List of house music artists
List of performances on Top of the Pops
List of 1990s one-hit wonders in the United States

References

External links
 

People from Stoke-on-Trent
English house musicians
Acid house musicians
Remixers
Black British musicians
English songwriters
English record producers
Year of birth missing (living people)
Living people
Musicians from Staffordshire
FFRR Records artists